Iago Azevedo dos Santos (born 22 May 1992), best known as Iago Santos, is a Brazilian professional footballer who plays for Al-Shabab as a defender.

Career
Born in Itaboraí, Brazil, Santos joined Académica in the Primeira Liga on 14 July 2014, arriving from Duque de Caxias. He made his professional debut at 16 August 2014, in a one-all draw against Sporting.

In June 2017, after spending a year in the UAE Division One with Dibba Al-Hisn, Iago returns to Portugal signing a 3-year deal with Moreirense. On 5 July 2020 Iago signing a 2-year deal with Al-Taawoun. On 30 January 2022, Iago joined Al-Shabab on a two-and-a-half year contract.

References

External links

1992 births
Living people
Brazilian footballers
Association football defenders
Primeira Liga players
UAE First Division League players
Saudi Professional League players
Duque de Caxias Futebol Clube players
Associação Académica de Coimbra – O.A.F. players
Dibba Al-Hisn Sports Club players
Moreirense F.C. players
Al-Taawoun FC players
Al-Shabab FC (Riyadh) players
Brazilian expatriate footballers
Expatriate footballers in Portugal
Brazilian expatriate sportspeople in Portugal
Expatriate footballers in the United Arab Emirates
Brazilian expatriate sportspeople in the United Arab Emirates
Expatriate footballers in Saudi Arabia
Brazilian expatriate sportspeople in Saudi Arabia
Sportspeople from Rio de Janeiro (state)
People from Itaboraí